The Harley-Davidson XLCR was an American café racer motorcycle manufactured by Harley-Davidson between 1977 and 1979.

Some say that designer Willie G. Davidson created it from the existing XLCH Sportster, initially as his personal vehicle.[1] The bike was actually designed by a committee of three people: Bob Modero (an engineer at Harley) Jim Haubert (Jim Haubert Engineering) hired as an independent Skunkworks contractor and Willie G. Although he was not present, this group had a strong styling influence from Dean Wixom when the three decided, as one of the starting points, to enlarge a dirt track XR750 fuel tank. Mr. Wixom was the original designer of this fuel tank.

Changed styling included the addition of a "bikini" fairing, slim front fender, reshaped fuel tank, a pillion-free saddle and unique "siamesed" two-into-two exhaust. It was "largely ignored" by consumers when launched in the 1970s, and "famously a sales flop", a "narcoleptic turner" due to long wheelbase and cruiser-like steering geometry, with "lethargic performance", but by thirty years later, had become a collectors item.

Manufacturing numbers:
 
1977, 1923 pcs at price of 3595 USD

1978, 1201 pcs at price of 3623 USD

1979, 9 or 10 pcs remaining parts from stock.

In 2013 a 1977 model sold for 12,000 dollars at an auction. In 2004 a 1978 model went for 9,900 at an auction in New Zealand. In 2010 a 1977 model sold for about US$20,000 by Bonhams at auction.

Specifications
Specs in the infobox are from Motorcyclist.

References

Notes

Sources

 

. Motorcycle Classics. July/August 2016

Further reading

Motorcycles introduced in 1977
XLCR